Joy Scouts is a 1939 Our Gang short comedy film directed by Edward Cahn.  It was the 180th Our Gang short (181st episode, 92nd talking short, 93rd talking episode, and 12th MGM produced episode) that was released.

Plot
Told that they are too young to join the Greenpoint Boy Scouts, the gang forms a troop of their own. Unfortunately, their camping and survival skills leave much to be desired. They pitch a tent over a well getting soaked; they burn the bacon, wieners, and fish they try to cook; get caught in a rainstorm, and get poison ivy. A flood traps the kids, but some real scouts come to the rescue.

Notability
Joy Scouts marked the debut of Mickey Gubitosi. Gubitosi would eventually adopt the screen name of Robert Blake several years later but continued to be known as Mickey on the series. He would appear in nearly every succeeding Our Gang entry until production ceased in 1944.

Our Gang also gets a new director named Edward Cahn. George Sidney transfers to other directing positions at MGM and becomes a prominent director in the coming years. He would go on to direct movies such as The Harvey Girls starring Judy Garland, Viva Las Vegas starring Elvis Presley, Kiss Me Kate and Bye Bye Birdie.

Cast

The Gang
 Eugene Lee as Porky
 George McFarland as Spanky
 Carl Switzer as Alfalfa
 Billie Thomas as Buckwheat
 Mickey Gubitosi as Mickey
 Leonard Landy as Leonard

Additional cast
 Forbes Murray as Scoutmaster
 The Boys Scout Troupe 59 of Los Angeles as themselves

See also
 Our Gang filmography

References

External links
 
 

1939 films
1939 comedy films
American black-and-white films
Films directed by Edward L. Cahn
Metro-Goldwyn-Mayer short films
Our Gang films
1939 short films
Films about the Boy Scouts of America
1930s American films